Herbert A. Posner (March 1, 1925 - March 18, 2018) was an American politician who served in the New York State Assembly from 1967 to 1975.

References

1925 births
2018 deaths
Democratic Party members of the New York State Assembly
Public officeholders of Rockaway, Queens
Politicians from the Bronx